Dual specificity mitogen-activated protein kinase kinase 1 is an enzyme that in humans is encoded by the MAP2K1 gene.

Function 

The protein encoded by this gene is a member of the dual-specificity protein kinase family that acts as a mitogen-activated protein (MAP) kinase kinase. MAP kinases, also known as extracellular signal-regulated kinases (ERKs), act as an integration point for multiple biochemical signals. This protein kinase lies upstream of MAP kinases and stimulates the enzymatic activity of MAP kinases upon activation by a wide variety of extra- and intracellular signals. As an essential component of the MAP kinase signal transduction pathway, this kinase is involved in many cellular processes such as proliferation, differentiation, transcription regulation and development. MAP2K1 is altered in 1.05% of all human cancers.

Meiosis
The genomes of diploid organisms in natural populations are highly polymorphic for insertions and deletions.  During meiosis double-strand breaks (DSBs) that form within such polymorphic regions must be repaired by inter-sister chromatid exchange, rather than by inter-homolog exchange.  Molecular-level studies of recombination during budding yeast meiosis have shown that recombination events initiated by DSBs in regions that lack corresponding sequences in the homolog are efficiently repaired by inter-sister chromatid recombination.  This recombination occurs with the same timing as inter-homolog recombination, but with reduced (2- to 3-fold) yields of joint molecules.

MAP2K1 is also known as MEK1 (see Mitogen-activated protein kinase kinase).  MEK1 is a meiotic chromosome-axis-associated kinase that is thought to slow down, but not entirely block, sister chromatid recombination. Loss of MEK1 allows inter-sister DSB repair and also inter-sister Holliday junction intermediates to increase. Despite the normal activity of MEK1 in reducing inter-sister chromatid recombination, such recombination still occurs frequently during normal budding yeast meiosis (although not as frequently as during mitosis), and up to one-third of all recombination events are between sister chromatids.

Interactions
MAP2K1 has been shown to interact with C-Raf, Phosphatidylethanolamine binding protein 1, MAP2K1IP1, GRB10, MAPK3, MAPK8IP3, MAPK1 MP1, and MAP3K1.

References

Further reading

External links
  GeneReviews/NCBI/NIH/UW entry on Noonan syndrome
  GeneReviews/NCBI/NIH/UW entry on Cardiofaciocutaneous Syndrome

EC 2.7.12